Norman Macleod or MacLeod may refer to:

Norm MacLeod (1904–1951), Australian rules footballer
Norman MacLeod (Canadian businessman), president of the Liberal Party of Canada
Norman Macleod (Caraid nan Gaidheal) (1783–1862), Scottish churchman and writer
Norman Macleod (1812–1872), his son, Scottish churchman and writer
Norman Macleod (chess problemist) (1927–1991), chess problemist
Norman Macleod (journalist) (born 1967), Scottish television presenter
Norman MacLeod (The Wicked Man) (1705–1772), Scottish clan chief
Norman MacLeod of MacLeod (1812–1895), 25th chief of Clan MacLeod
Norman Macleod Ferrers (1829–1903), British mathematician and university administrator
Norman Magnus MacLeod of MacLeod (1839–1929), 26th chief of Clan MacLeod
Norman Macleod (musician), Private Maple in Dad's Army stage show
Norman Macleod (moderator) (1838–1911), moderator of the General Assembly of the Church of Scotland, 1900
Norman MacLeod (British Army officer) (1754–1801), British soldier and MP for Invernessshire, 1790–1796
Norman Cranstoun Macleod (1866–1945), Chief Justice of the Bombay High Court
Norman Macleod (1754-1801), British politician

See also
Norman Mcleod (disambiguation)
Norman Lang (bishop) (Norman MacLeod Lang, 1875–1956), Bishop of Leicester